Rafael Morais is an actor. He studied theater in Lisbon, Portugal and at the Stella Adler Academy in Los Angeles. Rafael Morais has worked with globally celebrated filmmakers such as Nick Hamm, Marco Martins, Pedro Cabeleira, Luis Prieto, João Canijo, Tiago Guedes, among others.

Personal life
Morais was born in Portugal to an antique restorer mother and a contractor father. He was raised in Lisbon and graduated from EPTC, one of the most prestigious acting schools in Portugal, followed by a scholarship by the Actors Guild to study at the renowned Stella Adler Studio of Acting in Los Angeles.  
Morais speaks fluent English, Portuguese, French, and Spanish.

Morais divides his time between Portugal and the United States.

Theater career
Morais has appeared in many theater productions such as Sarah Kane's Phaedra's Love at the Mirita Casimiro Theater; "Music Around Circles" by Marco Martins; "The Constitution" by Mickael de Oliveira at the MiMoDa Studios in Los Angeles; Arnold Wesker's The Kitchen; "The Party", an original production of Nature Theater of Oklahoma and "Man to Man" by Manfred Karge, an Arena Ensemble Production.

Film career
Rafael Morais had his breakout role in Marco Martins' controversial film "How to Draw a Perfect Circle" (Portugal's official submission to the 82nd Academy Awards and winner of the Best Ensemble Acting Award at the Rio de Janeiro International Film Festival).

Some of Rafael's other notable work includes the critically acclaimed film "Blood of My Blood" (Portuguese entry for the 85th Academy Awards) by acclaimed director João Canijo. "Blood of My Blood" was the official selection for festivals such as: Toronto International Film Festival, Palm Springs International Film Festival, AFI Fest, Berlin Film Festival, and many others. The film received the FIPRESCI Prize at the San Sebastian International Film Festival and a Special Mention at the Miami International Film Festival; "Doomed Love" (Locarno International Film Festival's official selection); "Joshua Tree, 1951" (Palm Springs International Film Festival; Santa Barbara International Film Festival; the two hit Netflix series "Glória (2021 TV series)" and "White Lines", created by Álex Pina ("Money Heist").

In 2013, Rafael Morais wrote, directed and starred in "You Are The Blood" (IndieLisboa International Film Festival’s official selection and NewFilmMakers Film Festival main competition).

In 2023, Rafael will be seen portraying the iconic painter Amadeo de Souza-Cardoso in Vicente Alves do Ó's highly anticipated biopic "Amadeo" and also starring in Gentian Koçi's "A Cup of Coffee and New Shoes On", João Canijo's "Mal Viver" and "Viver Mal", as well as Sebastião Salgado's "Fateful Dawn"; Bruno Gascon's "Homeland" and the upcoming Netflix series "Fishtail"; among others.

Rafael Morais has been nominated twice as Best Actor at the Portuguese Golden Globes and was awarded the L'Oreal Rising Star Award at the LEFFEST International Film Festival.

Filmography

References 

Living people
Portuguese male film actors
People from Coimbra
Portuguese expatriates in the United States
Year of birth missing (living people)